Gulf breeze may refer to:

 Gulf Breeze (train), (1989–1995) Amtrak train in Alabama between Birmingham and Mobile
 Gulf Breeze, Florida, USA; a city in Santa Rosa County
 Gulf Breeze High School, a public High School in Gulf Breeze, Florida 
 Gulf Breeze Library, a library in Gulf Breeze, Florida 
 Gulf Breeze Middle School, a public middle school in Gulf Breeze, Florida 
 Gulf Breeze Zoo, a zoo in Woodlawn Beach, Florida

See also
 Bay breeze (disambiguation)
 breeze (disambiguation)
 Gulf (disambiguation)
 Third Gulf Breeze, archaeological site in Gulf Breeze, Santa Rosa, Florida, USA